Journey to Addis is the third album by Jamaican reggae group Third World, released by Island Records in 1978. It marks a shift from pure reggae to a fusion of reggae and soul music.

The group was looking for a worldwide success and not success in just Jamaica and England, hence the new fusion approach, which may not have pleased the die-hard reggae fans. A case in point may be the O'Jays cover "Now That We Found Love". The song peaked at number 10 in the UK and number 47 on the Billboard Hot 100. The follow-up single, “Cool Meditation,” was a British top 20 hit.

Track listing
Track listing in Discogs:

Personnel
Third World
Bunny Rugs - vocals
Michael "Ibo" Cooper - keyboards
Steven "Cat" Coore - lead guitar
Irvin "Carrot" Jarrett - percussions
Richard "Richie" Daley - bass
Willie Stewart - drums

Production
Produced by Alex Sadkin and Third World.
Cover painting by Tony Wright.

References

Third World (band) albums
Albums produced by Alex Sadkin
1978 albums
Island Records albums